West Rancho Dominguez, formerly known as West Compton, is an unincorporated census-designated place (CDP) located in southern Los Angeles County, California. Per the 2020 census, the population was 24,347. The community lies to the west (but is not a part) of the city of Compton. The ZIP Codes encompassing the CDP area are 90220 & 90248.

Geography

According to the United States Census Bureau, the CDP has a total area of 1.7 square miles (4.3 km2), all land.

Demographics

2020 census

Note: the US Census treats Hispanic/Latino as an ethnic category. This table excludes Latinos from the racial categories and assigns them to a separate category. Hispanics/Latinos can be of any race.

2010
At the 2010 census the CDP had a population of 5,669. The racial makeup of the CDP was 1,054 (18.6%) White (1.3% Non-Hispanic White), 2,974 (52.5%) African American, 32 (0.6%) Native American, 46 (0.8%) Asian, 21 (0.4%) Pacific Islander, 1,354 (23.9%) from other races, and 188 (3.3%) from two or more races. Hispanic or Latino of any race were 2,526 persons (44.6%).

The census reported that 5,654 people (99.7% of the population) lived in households, 12 (0.2%) lived in non-institutionalized group quarters, and 3 (0.1%) were institutionalized.

There were 1,537 households, 774 (50.4%) had children under the age of 18 living in them, 623 (40.5%) were opposite-sex married couples living together, 505 (32.9%) had a female householder with no husband present, 139 (9.0%) had a male householder with no wife present.  There were 88 (5.7%) unmarried opposite-sex partnerships, and 10 (0.7%) same-sex married couples or partnerships. 210 households (13.7%) were one person and 102 (6.6%) had someone living alone who was 65 or older. The average household size was 3.68.  There were 1,267 families (82.4% of households); the average family size was 3.98.

The age distribution was 1,661 people (29.3%) under the age of 18, 636 people (11.2%) aged 18 to 24, 1,449 people (25.6%) aged 25 to 44, 1,241 people (21.9%) aged 45 to 64, and 682 people (12.0%) who were 65 or older.  The median age was 32.9 years. For every 100 females there were 88.7 males.  For every 100 females age 18 and over, there were 82.3 males.

There were 1,582 housing units at an average density of 957.4 per square mile, of the occupied units 1,114 (72.5%) were owner-occupied and 423 (27.5%) were rented. The homeowner vacancy rate was 1.1%; the rental vacancy rate was 2.1%.  4,129 people (72.8% of the population) lived in owner-occupied housing units and 1,525 people (26.9%) lived in rental housing units.

During 2009–2013, West Rancho Dominguez had a median household income of $45,373, with 17.2% of the population living below the federal poverty line.

2000
At the 2000 census there were 5,435 people, 1,535 households, and 1,209 families in the CDP. The population density was 3,313.0 inhabitants per square mile (1,279.6/km2). The racial makeup of the CDP was 67.9% African American, 4.1% White, 0.6% Native American, 0.9% Asian, 0.4% Pacific Islander, 22.5% from other races, and 3.5% from two or more races. Hispanic or Latino of any race were 33.8% of the population. Non-Hispanic whites comprise only 1.6%.

Of the 1,535 households 37.9% had children under the age of 18 living with them, 44.8% were married couples living together, 26.3% had a female householder with no husband present, and 21.2% were non-families. 17.0% of households were one person and 8.5% were one person aged 65 or older.  The average household size was 3.53 and the average family size was 3.90.

The age distribution was 33.2% under the age of 18, 10.1% from 18 to 24, 26.6% from 25 to 44, 17.7% from 45 to 64, and 12.3% 65 or older.  The median age was 31 years. For every 100 females there were 91.6 males.  For every 100 females age 18 and over, there were 84.9 males.

The median household income was $38,000 and the median family income  was $40,280. Males had a median income of $28,719 versus $24,954 for females. The per capita income for the CDP was $12,255.  About 14.2% of families and 17.0% of the population were below the poverty line, including 21.4% of those under age 18 and 13.8% of those age 65 or over.

Education
Compton Unified School District and Los Angeles Unified School District serve portions of West Rancho Dominguez.

Government

References

Census-designated places in Los Angeles County, California
Gateway Cities